Ritzema is a surname. Notable people with the surname include:

Jan Ritzema Bos (1850–1928), Dutch plant pathologist 
Wayne Ritzema (born 1975), English cricketer
Rudolphus Ritzema (1739–1803), American officer during the American Revolutionary War